Walter King Stone (1875–1949) was an American artist and illustrator, teaching art at Cornell University.

Early life and education 
Stone was born in Barnard, Monroe County, New York, on March 2, 1875, the son of William Talmage and Jenny Filer Stone.
He attended public school in Rochester and in 1894 moved to Brooklyn to attend the Pratt Institute. He initially studied drawing under Ida C. Haskell and in 1895 he was a student of Arthur Wesley Dow and adopted Dow's tonalist style.Stone noted that everything he'd done as an artist he owed to Dow and called him a "born teacher." Stone's technique involved the use of water color over a base drawing in charcoal, applied in simple masses and few colors. This method was ideally suited to the improved methods of reproduction.

The Illustrator 
For two years he was a keeper in the aviary at the Washington Zoo, making drawings and befriending two important zoological illustrators: Charles Livingston Bull and Louis Agassiz Fuertes.  By 1900 he'd moved to New York and was active as an independent illustrator, painter and writer, winning widespread recognition for his nature illustrations. His work appeared in Scribner’s Magazine, Century Magazine, Colliers’, Outing, Country Life in America, St. Nicholas, and in the Country Gentleman, as well as in various books. 

Stone traveled to Germany in 1908, making illustrations of the Swarzwald for Scribner's Magazine.  In the same issue appeared a story by Walter Pritchard Eaton and Stone immediately wrote to him, suggesting a collaboration.Their works varied widely, including a story of New York harbor,  and in 1916, Glacier National Park.  There Stone provided artwork for Eaton's railroad-sponsored stories, working from Many-Glaciers Hotel, then recently built by the Great Northern Railroad. John Singer Sargent was also painting at Glacier during this season. While in New York he became a member of the Salmagundi Club, exhibiting works there in 1914-15.

The Teacher 

Stone began teaching at Cornell University as Acting Professor of Drawing in 1920, as Assistant Professor beginning in 1922, as Associate Professor in 1942, and as Associate Professor Emeritus from 1943.

He still took time for painting trips. In 1927-1928 he traveled to the Mojave Desert, painting for a Good Housekeeping story with Alice Adams Means. Stone's works from this trip exhibit a higher-key palette and more impressionistic brushwork, much like the California Impressionists of the day.  

Stone exhibited his works at the Arnot Museum in Elmira, New York, beginning in 1929 and in 1943 he held a solo show at Washington's Smithsonian Natural History Museum.

Stone died in Ithaca, New York, in 1949.

Legacy 
Cornell University established the Edith and Walter King Stone Memorial Prize, awarded to B.F.A. students in their junior year based on accomplishment and promise in the field of art.

Gallery

References 

20th-century American painters
American illustrators
Cornell University faculty
1875 births
1949 deaths
Pratt Institute alumni
Painters from New York (state)
American male painters
Artists from Rochester, New York
People from Monroe County, New York
20th-century American male artists